Macteola anomala is a species of sea snail, a marine gastropod mollusk in the family Mangeliidae.

Description
The length of the shell varies between 8 mm and 12 mm.

The shell is rather solid. It is light brown, with a darker, black-spotted median band, and undulating longitudinal stripes, which are more prominent near the base of the body whorl.

In fresh specimens a delicate grain sculpture is visible under the lens. The colour varies. There may be only a peripheral row of separate intercostal brown spots, or beneath these there may run a continuous orange zone, anterior to which the shell may be faintly suffused with pink.

Distribution
This marine species is endemic to Australia and occurs off New South Wales, South Australia, Tasmania, Victoria and Western Australia.

References

  Angas, G.F. 1877. Description of a new species of Helix from South Australia. Proceedings of the Zoological Society of London 1877: 33-34
 Tryon, G.W. 1880. Muricinae and Purpurinae. Manual of Conchology. Philadelphia : G.W. Tryon Vol. 2. 
 Tate, R. 1880. Rectification of the nomenclature of Purpura anomala Angas. Proceedings of the Linnean Society of New South Wales 5(2): 131-132 
 Verco, J.C. 1909. Notes on South Australian marine Mollusca with descriptions of new species. Part XII. Transactions of the Royal Society of South Australia 33: 293-342
 Hedley, C. 1922. A revision of the Australian Turridae. Records of the Australian Museum 13(6): 213-359, pls 42-56
 May, W.L. 1923. An Illustrated Index of Tasmanian Shells: with 47 plates and 1052 species. Hobart : Government Printer 100 pp. 
 Allan, J.K. 1950. Australian Shells: with related animals living in the sea, in freshwater and on the land. Melbourne : Georgian House xix, 470 pp., 45 pls, 112 text figs.
 Laseron, C. 1954. Revision of the New South Wales Turridae (Mollusca). Australian Zoological Handbook. Sydney : Royal Zoological Society of New South Wales 1-56, pls 1-12.
 Liu J.Y. [Ruiyu] (ed.). (2008). Checklist of marine biota of China seas. China Science Press. 1267 pp

External links
 
  Tucker, J.K. 2004 Catalog of recent and fossil turrids (Mollusca: Gastropoda). Zootaxa 682:1-1295.

anomala
Gastropods described in 1877
Gastropods of Australia